Bibel TV is Germany's first Christian television channel. Since 1 October 2002, it has been broadcasting 24 hours each day of the year. It can be received by digital satellite dish (Astra satellites), most digital cable systems in Germany, Austria and Switzerland, a number of (old) analogue cable systems and on terrestrial DVB-T2 throughout Germany as well as on the web by continuous streaming on Bibel TV's website.

Bibel TV is free to air TV.

Bibel TV is a charitable not for profit foundation (Stiftung) based in Hamburg in the north of Germany. It is Germany's first not-for-profit charitable television channel and is financed by support from more than 58,000 Christians who voluntarily donate.

16 Christian organizations were a part of the founding of Bibel TV. Among them are a subsidiary of the television arm of the association of Evangelical Free churches (including Baptist, Methodist, Mennonite, Pentecostal, Salvation Army), the Evangelical Church in Germany, the Roman Catholic Church in Germany, the German Billy Graham Association, Campus Crusade for Christ in Germany and the German Bible Society, called Deutsche Bibelgesellschaft.

The director of Bibel TV is Matthias Brender, following the retirement in February 2013 of the founding director, Henning Röhl.

References

External links 
Bibel TV website
Bibel TV at LyngSat Address

Television stations in Germany
Evangelical television networks
Television channels and stations established in 2002
2002 establishments in Germany
Mass media in Hamburg